There is one institution in Equatorial Guinea considered to be a university:

 National University of Equatorial Guinea
In addition, since 1981, the Spanish National University of Distance Education (UNED) has a campus in Guinea.

Equatorial Guinea

Universities
Equatorial Guinea